In Classical antiquity and Greco-Roman geography, Colchis was an exonym for the Georgian polity of Egrisi located on the coast of the Black Sea, centered in present-day western Georgia.

Its population, the Colchians are generally thought to have been an early Kartvelian-speaking tribe ancestral to the contemporary western Georgians, namely Svans and Zans. According to David Marshall Lang: "one of the most important elements in the modern Georgian nation, the Colchians were probably established in the Caucasus by the Middle Bronze Age."

It has been described in modern scholarship as "the earliest Georgian formation", which, along with the Kingdom of Iberia, would later contribute significantly to the development of the Kingdom of Georgia and the Georgian nation.

Colchis is known in Greek mythology as the destination of the Argonauts, as well as the home to Medea and the Golden Fleece. It was also described as a land rich with gold, iron, timber and honey that would export its resources mostly to ancient Hellenic city-states. Colchis likely had a diverse population. According to Greek and Roman sources, between 70 and 300 languages were spoken in Dioscourias (modern Sukhumi) alone.

Abkhaz, Scythian, Anatolian, and Greek names have all been identified in Colchis. Any of these groups could have constituted the ruling class. According to Rayfield, the first mention of Colchis is during the reign of the Assyrian king Tukulti-Ninurta I (1245–1209 BC) when he mentions "40 kings by the Upper [Black] Sea".

Its geography is mostly assigned to what is now the western part of Georgia and encompasses the present-day Georgian provinces of Samegrelo, Imereti, Guria, Adjara, Svaneti, Racha; Abkhazia; modern Russia's Sochi and Tuapse districts; and present-day Turkey’s Artvin, Rize, and Trabzon provinces.

Geography and toponyms 
Colchis, Kolkha, Qulḫa, or Kilkhi which existed from the c. 13th to the 1st centuries BC, is regarded as an early ethnically Georgian polity; the name of the Colchians was used as the collective term for early Kartvelian tribes which populated the eastern coast of the Black Sea in Greco-Roman ethnography.

According to Donald Rayfield, an ethnic makeup of Colchis is "obscure" and that Kartvelian names "are conspicuously absent from the few anthronyms found in Colchian burials." Instead, Greek, Anatolian, Iranian, and possibly Abkhaz names are present.

The name Colchis is thought to have derived from the Urartian Qulḫa. In the mid-eighth century BC, Sarduri II the King of Urartu, inscribed his victory over Qulḫa on a stele; however, the exact location of Qulḫa is disputed. Some scholars argue the name Qulḫa (Colchís) originally referred to a land to the west of Georgia. Others argue Qulḫa may have been located in the south, near modern Göle, Turkey.

According to Levan Gordeziani, while the Greek Colchis etymologically descends from Urartian Qulḫa, the Greeks may have applied the name to a different region (and/or cultures) than the preceding Urartians had. Further confusion rests in possible differences in the Greeks' own usage of the name Colchis in political and mythological contexts (i.e. the relationship between "Aia-Colchis" and "the land of Colchis").

According to the scholar of Caucasian studies Cyril Toumanoff:

According to most Classical-era sources, Colchis was bordered on the south-west by Pontus, on the west by the Black Sea, as far as the river Corax. To its north was the Greater Caucasus, beyond which was Sarmatia. On its east it bordered the Kingdom of Iberia and Montes Moschici (now the Lesser Caucasus). The south of Colchis bordered Armenia. The westward extent of the country is considered differently by different authors: Strabo makes Colchis begin at Trabzon, while Ptolemy, on the other hand, extends Pontus to the Rioni River.

The Greek name  is first used to describe a geographic area in the writings of Aeschylus and Pindar. Earlier writers speak of the "Kolchian" people and their mythical king Aeëtes, as well as his eponymous city Aea or Aia, but don't make explicit references to a Kolchis nation or region. The main river was known as the Phasis (now Rioni) and was, according to some writers the southern boundary of Colchis, but more probably flowed through the middle of that country from the Caucasus west into the Euxine, and the Anticites or Atticitus (now Kuban). Arrian mentions many others by name, but they would seem to have been little more than mountain torrents: the most important of them were Charieis, Chobus or Cobus, Singames, Tarsuras, Hippus, Astelephus, Chrysorrhoas, several of which are also noticed by Ptolemy and Pliny. The chief towns were Dioscurias or Dioscuris (under the Romans called Sebastopolis, now Sukhumi) on the seaboard of the Euxine, Sarapana (now Shorapani), Phasis (now Poti), Pityus (now Pitsunda), Apsaros (now Gonio), Surium (now Vani), Archaeopolis (now Nokalakevi), Macheiresis, and Cyta or Cutatisium or Aia (now Kutaisi), the traditional birthplace of Medea. Scylax mentions also Mala or Male, which he, in contradiction to other writers, makes the birthplace of Medea.

Physical-geographic characteristics 
 

In physical geography, Colchis is usually defined as the area east of the Black Sea coast, restricted from the north by the southwestern slopes of the Greater Caucasus, from the south by the northern slopes of the Lesser Caucasus in Georgia and Eastern Black Sea (Karadeniz) Mountains in Turkey, and from the east by Likhi Range, connecting the Greater and the Lesser Caucasus. Marginal parts of the region are mountains of the Great and the Lesser Caucasus and Likhi Range.

Its territory mostly corresponds to what is now the western part of Georgia and encompasses the present-day Georgian provinces of Samegrelo, Imereti, Guria, Adjara, Abkhazia, Svaneti, Racha; the modern Turkey’s Rize, Trabzon and Artvin provinces (Lazistan, Tao-Klarjeti); and the modern Russia’s Sochi and Tuapse districts.

The climate is mild humid; near Batumi, annual rainfall level reaches , which is the absolute maximum for continental western Eurasia. The dominating natural landscapes of Colchis are temperate rainforests, yet degraded in the plain part of the region; wetlands (along the coastal parts of Colchis Plain); subalpine and alpine meadows.

Colchis has a high proportion of Neogene and Palaeogene relict plants and animals, with the closest relatives in distant parts of the world: five species of Rhododendrons and other evergreen shrubs, wingnuts, Caucasian salamander, Caucasian parsley frog, eight endemic species of lizards from the genus Darevskia, the Caucasus adder (Vipera kaznakovi), Robert's snow vole, and endemic cave shrimp.

Economy, agriculture and natural resources 
Millet was the main staple crop in Colchis. Wheat grew in certain regions and was also imported by sea. Similarly, local wines were produced and some wines were brought from overseas. The Colchian plain provided ample grazing land for cattle and horses, with the name of Phasis associated with fine horses. The wetlands were a home for waterfowl, while Colchian pheasants were exported to Rome and became a symbol of excess condemned by Roman moralists. The Colchian hinterland lacked salt and demand was satisfied partially by local production on the coast and partially by imports from the northern coast of the Black Sea.

Colchis provided slaves as a tribute to the Achaemenid Empire and Colchian slaves are also attested in Ancient Greece.

History

Prehistory and earliest references 
The eastern Black Sea region in antiquity was home to the well-developed Bronze Age culture known as the Colchian culture, related to the neighbouring Koban culture, that emerged toward the Middle Bronze Age. In at least some parts of Colchis, the process of urbanization seems to have been well advanced by the end of the second millennium BC. The Colchian Late Bronze Age (fifteenth to eighth century BC) saw the development of significant skill in the smelting and casting of metals. Sophisticated farming implements were made, and fertile, well-watered lowlands and a mild climate promoted the growth of progressive agricultural techniques.

The earliest attestations of the name of Colchis can be found in the 8th century Greek poet Eumelus of Corinth as "Κολχίδα" and earlier, in Urartian records as "Qulḫa" mentioned by the Urartian kings, who conquered it in 744 or 743 BC.

According to Svante Cornell, "What could be conceived as the proto Georgian statehood emerged mainly in the Western parts of today's Georgia, with the kingdom of Colchis (Kolkheti) in the sixth century BCE.

Colchis was inhabited by a number of tribes whose settlements lay along the shore of the Black Sea. Chief among those were the Machelones, Heniochi, Zydretae, Lazi, Chalybes, Tibareni/Tubal, Mossynoeci, Macrones, Moschi, Marres, Apsilae, Abasci, Sanigae, Coraxi, Coli, Melanchlaeni, Geloni and Soani (Suani). The ancients assigned various origins to the tribes that inhabited Colchis.

Herodotus regarded the Colchians as "honey-coloured and woolly-haired", an Egyptian race. Herodotus states that the Colchians, with the Ancient Egyptians and the Ethiopians, were the first to practice circumcision, a custom which he claims that the Colchians inherited from remnants of the army of Pharaoh Sesostris (Senusret III). Herodotus writes:

These claims have been widely rejected by modern historians. It is in doubt if Herodotus had ever been to Colchis or Egypt.

According to Pliny the Elder:

Many modern theories suggest that the ancestors of the Laz-Mingrelians constituted the dominant ethnic and cultural presence in the region in antiquity, and hence played a significant role in the ethnogenesis of the modern Georgians.

Pausanias, a 1st-century BCE Greek geographer, citing the poet Eumelos, assigned Aeëtes, the mythological first king of Colchis, a Greek origin.

Persian rule 
The tribes living in the southern Colchis (Macrones, Moschi, and Marres) were incorporated into Persia and formed the 19th satrapy, while the northern tribes submitted "voluntarily" and had to send to the Persian court 100 girls and 100 boys every five years. In 400 BC, shortly after the Ten Thousand reached Trapezus, a battle was fought between them and the Colchis in which the latter were decisively defeated. The influence exerted on Colchis by the vast Achaemenid Empire with its thriving commerce and wide economic and commercial ties with other regions accelerated the socio-economic development of the Colchian land.

Subsequently, the Colchis people appear to have overthrown the Persian Authority, and to have formed an independent state. According to Ronald Suny this western Georgian state was federated to Kartli-Iberia, and its kings ruled through skeptoukhi (royal governors) who received a staff from the king. According to David Braund's reading of Strabo's account, the native Colchian dynasty continued ruling the country in spite of its fragmentation into skeptoukhies.

Gocha R. Tsetskhladze explains that although Colchis and neighboring Iberia were once viewed as not having been under Achaemenid rule, "ever more evidence is emerging to show that they were, forming a lesser part of the Armenian satrapy".

Under Pontus 
Mithridates VI quelled an uprising in the region in 83 BC and gave Colchis to his son Mithridates, who, soon being suspected in having plotted against his father, was executed. During the Third Mithridatic War, Mithridates VI made another of his sons, Machares, king of Bosporus and Colchis, who held his power, but only for a short period. On the defeat of Mithridates VI of Pontus in 65 BC, Colchis was occupied by Pompey, who captured one of the local chiefs (sceptuchus) Olthaces, and installed Aristarchus as a dynast (63–47 BC). On the fall of Pompey, Pharnaces II, son of Mithridates, took advantage of Julius Caesar being occupied in Egypt, and reduced Colchis, Armenia, and some part of Cappadocia, defeating Gnaeus Domitius Calvinus, whom Caesar subsequently sent against him. His triumph was, however, short-lived. Under Polemon I, the son and heir of Zenon, Colchis was part of the Pontus and the Bosporan Kingdom. After the death of Polemon (8 BC), his second wife Pythodorida of Pontus retained possession of Colchis as well as of Pontus, although the kingdom of Bosporus was wrested from her power. Her son and successor, Polemon II of Pontus, was induced by Emperor Nero to abdicate the throne, and both Pontus and Colchis were incorporated in the Province of Galatia (63) and later, in Cappadocia (81). Phasis, Dioscurias and other Greek settlements of the coast did not fully recover after the wars of 60-40 BC and Trebizond became the economical and political centre of the region.

Under Roman rule 

Despite the fact that all major fortresses along the sea coast were occupied by the Romans, their rule was relatively loose. In 69, the people of Pontus and Colchis under Anicetus staged a major uprising against the Roman Empire, which ended unsuccessfully. The lowlands and coastal area were frequently raided by fierce mountain tribes, with the Svaneti and Heniochi being the most powerful of them. Paying a nominal homage to Rome, they created their own kingdoms and enjoyed significant independence.

Under Hadrian, the Romans established relations with Colchian tribes. Hadrian sent his advisor, Arrian, to tour Colchis and Iberia. Arrian depicted a turbulent fluctuation of tribal powers and boundaries, with various hostile and anarchic tribes in the area. The Laz controlled most of coastal Colchis, while other tribes such as the Sanigs and Abasgoi escaped Roman jurisdiction. Other tribes, like the Apsilae, were becoming powerful and their king with the Romanised name Julianus was recognized by Trajan. Arrian listed the following peoples in his Periplus of the Euxine Sea written in 130-131 (from south to north): Sanni, Machelones, Heniochi, Zudreitae, Lazi, Apsilae, Abasgoi, Sanigs and Zilchi.

According to traditional accounts Christianity began to spread in the early first century by Andrew the Apostle, Simon the Zealot, and Saint Matthias. A change in burial patterns in the 3rd century was possibly due to Christian influence. The Hellenistic civilization, local paganism and Mithraic Mysteries would, however, remain widespread until the fourth century. Goths, dwelling in the Crimea and looking for new homes, raided Colchis in 253, but were repulsed with the help of the Roman garrison of Pitsunda. By the first century BC, the Lazica (or the Laz) kingdom was established in the region. Lazica became known as Egrisi in 66 BC when Egrisi became a vassal of the Roman Empire after the Caucasian campaign of Pompey.

Rulers 
Little is known of the rulers of Colchis;

In mythology

In Classical Greek mythology, Colchis was the home of Aeëtes, Medea, the Golden Fleece, and the fire-breathing Colchis bulls and was the destination of the Argonauts.

Colchis also is thought to be a possible homeland of the Amazons. Amazons also were said to be of Scythian origin from Colchis.

According to the Greek mythology, Colchis was a fabulously wealthy land situated on the mysterious periphery of the heroic world. Here in the sacred grove of the war god Ares, King Aeëtes hung the Golden Fleece until it was seized by Jason and the Argonauts. Colchis was also the land where the mythological Prometheus was punished by being chained to a mountain while an eagle ate at his liver for revealing to humanity the secret of fire.

Apollonius of Rhodes named Aea as the main city (Argonautica, passim). The main mythical characters from Colchis are:

 Absyrtus, son of Aeëtes
 Aeëtes, King of Colchis, son of the sun-god Helios and the Oceanid Perseis (a daughter of Oceanus), brother of Circe and Pasiphae, and father of Medea, Chalciope, and Absyrtus
 Chalciope, daughter of King Aeëtes
 Circe, sister of King Aeëtes
 Idyia, Queen of Colchis, mother of Medea, Chalciope, and Absyrtus
 Medea, daughter of King Aeëtes
 Pasiphaë, sister of Aeëtes

See also
 Pontus
 Roman Georgia

Explanatory notes

Citations

General sources 
 Braund, David. 1994. Georgia in Antiquity: A History of Colchis and Transcaucasian Iberia 550 BC–AD 562. Clarendon Press, Oxford. 
 
 Otar Lordkipanidze. Phasis: The River and City of Colchis. Geographica Historica 15, Franz Steiner 2000. 
 
 
 
 
 
 Gocha R. Tsetskhladze. "Pichvnari and Its Environs, 6th c BC–4th c A". Annales Littéraires de l'Université de Franche-Comté, 659, Editeurs: M. Clavel-Lévêque, E. Geny, P. Lévêque. Paris: Presses Universitaires Franc-Comtoises, 1999. 
 
 
 Akaki Urushadze. The Country of the Enchantress Media, Tbilisi, 1984 (in Russian and English)

External links 

"Colchis" in the Dictionary of Greek and Roman Geography (1854) (ed. William Smith, LLD)
Colchian coins
Strabo on Colchis
Herodotus on Colchis
Pliny on Colchis
Golden graves, archeological evidences
Colchis 
Colchis at the Piano (amarcord.be) 

 
Former countries in Europe
Former countries in Western Asia
Former monarchies of Western Asia
Historical regions
States and territories disestablished in the 2nd century BC
States and territories established in the 13th century BC